Industrial Bank is another name for an industrial loan company. 

Industrial Bank is also the name of some banks:

 Industrial Bank (China)
 Industrial Bank of Iraq
 Industrial Bank of Korea
 Industrial and Commercial Bank of China
 Industrial Bank of Kuwait
 Industrial Bank (Washington D.C.), a historic African American bank in Washington D.C.